Wally Rivers (24 April 1922 – 6 June 1998) was a South African cyclist. He competed in the individual and team road race events at the 1948 Summer Olympics.

References

External links
 

1922 births
1998 deaths
South African male cyclists
Olympic cyclists of South Africa
Cyclists at the 1948 Summer Olympics
Sportspeople from Bloemfontein
20th-century South African people